HMRK Zrinjski Mostar is a Croat-founded men's handball team from the city of Mostar, Bosnia and Herzegovina.

The club plays in the First League of the Federation of Bosnia and Herzegovina – South. It is part of the Zrinjski Mostar sport society. Fans of HMRK Zrinjski are known as Ultras.

Zrinjski's greatest accomplishment has been reaching the Last 16 of the 2017–18 EHF Challenge Cup and winning the National Cup in 2017.  The team squad consists of more than 90% of players from Mostar.

Honours 
Handball Cup of Bosnia and Herzegovina:
 Winners (1): 2017

European Record

Recent seasons

The recent season-by-season performance of the club:

Note: 2018–19 relegation for financial reasons
Key

Notable players
 Marino Marić
 Fahrudin Melić
 Marin Šego
 Igor Karačić
 Ivan Karačić
 Mirko Herceg
 Josip Perić

Coaching history 
 Enco Bukovac
 Zoran Dokić
 Željko Anić
 Damir Saltarić
 Lazar Raguž
 Goran Suton
 Zdravko Medić

External links
Zrinjski website

References

Bosnia and Herzegovina handball clubs
Handball clubs established in 1992
Sport in Mostar
Croatian sports clubs outside Croatia